Bahkin or Behkhin may refer to:
 Bahkin-e Pain